Fork Particle is a computer graphics visual effects modeling and software development kit (SDK) developed and sold by Fork Particle, Inc. Fork Particle uses its real time particle system technology to simulate visual effects or particle effects such as CGI explosions, fire, rain, smoke, dust, etc. Fork Particle is used in video games and visual simulation software such as a flight simulator. It has been licensed to game developers for Windows, macOS, Linux, PlayStation 3, PlayStation 4, Xbox 360 and Xbox One.

Notable Fork Particle licensees include Ubisoft, Trickstar Games, Firaxis Games, ZeniMax Online Studios, Electronic Arts, Microsoft, LEGO, and Sony. Video games that have utilized Fork Particle’s technology include Elder Scrolls Online, Sid Meier's Civilization: Beyond Earth, Rocksmith 2014 Edition, Empire Earth III, LEGO Universe, Splosion Man, Sid Meier's Civilization V and Sid Meier's Civilization VI.

Fork Particle SDK 
Fork Particle's real time technology component or particle engine is meant to be integrated and used with a video game engine or computer graphics engine. Particle effects are authored by VFX artists or designers using Fork Particle’s effects modeling tool and then brought into the user’s 3D computer graphics environment or 2D computer graphics environment where these particle effects are simulated by Fork Particle’s engine in real time and displayed by the user application’s graphics engine.

The Fork Particle SDK includes these components: real time particle engine (Fork Runtime SDK), particle editor or modeling tool (Fork Particle Studio), live update for in application particle effects editing (Fork Live Tuner), and particle effects definitions batch file exporter.

Technology Partners 
Fork Particle also includes incorporation or integrations with partner technologies:
 Microsoft Xbox 360
 Microsoft Xbox One
 Sony PlayStation 3
 Sony PlayStation 4
 Havok Physics
 Havok Vision Engine
 Emergent Gamebryo LightSpeed
 Perforce SCM
 Autodesk FBX
 NVidia PhysX
 Android
 Apple
 Intel (Multi-core processor support)

References

External links 
 Fork Particle official website (not accessible, Archive) – news, updates, screenshots, and information about Fork Particle
 Develop Online feature article on Fork Particle – “Particle effects middleware Fork Particle is all about making the most of your game’s big events…”
 Develop Magazine feature article on Fork Particle – “TOOLS SPOTLIGHT” (page 50-51)
 Firaxis Civilization V news article – “Firaxis Using Fork Particle Toolset For Civ V's Visual Effects” by Eric Caoili

3D graphics software
Middleware for video games
Software development kits
Virtual reality